The Andrews Memorial Chapel is a historic Carpenter Gothic-style former Presbyterian church building now located in Dunedin, Florida. It was built in 1888 as the Andrews Memorial Church on the corner of Scotland Street and Highland Avenue. Its name was carried over from an 1871 Presbyterian church located where the Dunedin Cemetery is now and commemorates William Andrews, son of John G. Andrews, who "died while riding a horse in a violent storm." The church is located next to Hammock Park (Dunedin, Florida).

In 1926 the building was renamed Andrews Memorial Chapel and moved south on Scotland Street to make way for what is now the First Presbyterian Church of Dunedin. In 1970 it was bought by the Dunedin Historical Society, which had it cut in half and moved to its present location. Restoration work began in 1974. Today it is open for visits on Sundays from 2 to 4 PM, and is maintained by the society as a popular venue for weddings, concerts and other events.

On July 31, 1972, it was added to the  National Register of Historic Places.

Gallery

References

External links
 Pinellas County listings at National Register of Historic Places
 Florida's Office of Cultural and Historical Programs
 Pinellas County listings
 Andrews Memorial Chapel
 Andrews Memorial Chapel website
 First Presbyterian Church of Dunedin website

National Register of Historic Places in Pinellas County, Florida
Churches on the National Register of Historic Places in Florida
Chapels in the United States
Carpenter Gothic church buildings in Florida
Presbyterian churches in Florida
Churches in Pinellas County, Florida
1888 establishments in Florida
Churches completed in 1888
Buildings and structures in Dunedin, Florida